Kilmore is a civil and ecclesiastical parish of County Cavan in Ireland.

Civil parish
Kilmore gives its name to an Irish civil parish which is located mainly in the barony of Upper Loughtee, but partly in the barony of Clanmahon, all in County Cavan in the Province of Ulster. Civil Parishes were used for local taxation purposes and their boundaries are shown on the nineteenth century Ordnance Survey of Ireland maps. For poor law purposes the civil parish was replaced by district electoral divisions in the mid-nineteenth century. According to the 1851 census the Civil Parish of Kilmore had a total of 91 townlands.

Ecclesiastical parishes
Church of Ireland parish

The Church of Ireland parish has two places of worship within the Diocese of Kilmore, Elphin and Ardagh. The most historic building is Kilmore Cathedral and is the seat of the Bishop of Kilmore, Elphin and Ardagh. The first church was built by St. Feithlimidh in the sixth century. In 1454, Bishop Aindrias Mac Brádaigh (Andrew McBrady) had this ancient church rebuilt and was given permission by Pope Nicholas V to be the bishop's cathedral. In the 17th century, Bishop Moigne had the cathedral renovated and a bishop's residence built. However, by 1858, the cathedral was described as "decayed, dilapidated and too small to accommodate the parishioners", and so a new cathedral was built in the grounds of the Bishop's Palace at a cost of £8000. It had been planned to demolish to old cathedral, but it was saved and is now used as the Parochial Hall. The second Church of Ireland place of worship in the parish is St Patrick's Church, Ballintemple, near Ballinagh. It was built in 1821 and is a rectangular building with a castellated tower.

The Rt. Rev. Dr. William Bedell (Irish: Uilliam Beidil; 1571–1642), Church of Ireland Lord Bishop of Kilmore, is believed to be buried in the churchyard of Kilmore Cathedral. Bishop Bedell, a former Provost of Trinity College Dublin, is famous for commissioning a translation of the Old Testament into Irish. Most of this translation was carried out by The Rev. Muircheartach Óg Ó Cíonga, the Anglican Rector of Templeport. Bedell was also very respected by the native Gaelic, Irish Catholic population of County Cavan.

Quite close to Kilmore Cathedral is the See House (also known as the Bishop's Palace), the former official residence of the Church of Ireland Lord Bishops of Kilmore, Elphin and Ardagh. The house was built in the late Georgian style in the 1830s and was designed by William Farrell.
Catholic parish
The Catholic parish has two places of worship. They are two of a number churches in the Diocese of Kilmore. It is not known when St Felim's Church, Ballinagh, was first built, but it existed as a slated church in 1790. A new church, designed by William Hague, Jr., was rebuilt in 1869, and rededicated on 7 February. The present church was completed in 1978 and rededicated on 2 July in the same year. The other Catholic place of worship is St Patrick's Church, Drumcor, and was built in 1809. It was extended in 1930 and the windows were replaced with steel frames and tinted cathedral glass. Major restoration was made to building in 1990, and it was rededicated by The Most Rev. Dr. Francis J. MacKiernan, Lord Bishop of Kilmore, on 14 July 1991.

Townlands

 Annagh, 
 Bellanagh, 
 Bellville, 
 Bleancup, 
 Breandrum, 
 Cauhoo, 
 Cavanfin, 
 Clarebane, 
 Clonagonnell, 
 Clonloskan, 
 Coolnagor (Ricehill), 
 Cordalea, 
 Corgarran, 
 Cormeen, 
 Cornacrea, 
 Cornamucklagh, 
 Corracanvy, 
 Corratober, 
 Corraveaty, 
 Corstruce, 
 Crenard, 
 Crossdoney, 
 Derinish Beg, 
 Derinish More, 
 Derries Lower, 
 Derries Upper, 
 Derryna, 
 Derrynagan, 
 Derrywinny, 
 Dreenan, 
 Drumard, 
 Drumbar, 
 Drumcarban, 
 Drumcon, 
 Drumcor, 
 Drumcrow, 
 Drumgor, 
 Drumhecknagh, 
 Drumhell, 
 Drumleny, 
 Drumlion, 
 Drummora Great, 
 Drummora Little, 
 Drummullan, 
 Drummurry, 
 Druumskeagh, 
 Eonish, 
 Farragh, 
 Farranydaly, 
 Gartbrattan, 
 Gartnanoul, 
 Glencorran, 
 Gortachurk, 
 Gortnashangan Lower (Bingfield), 
 Gortnashangan Upper (Hermitage), 
 Inch Island, 
 Inishconnell, 
 Kevit Lower, 
 Kevit Upper (Castlecosby), 
 Killygowan, 
 Killykeen, 
 Killyvally, 
 Kilmore Lower, 
 Kilmore Upper, 
 Kilsallagh, 
 Knockakishta, 
 Legaland, 
 Lisduff, 
 Lismore Demesne, 
 Lisnamandra, 
 Loughaconnick, 
 Marahill, 
 Monnery Lower, 
 Monnery Upper, 
 Newtown, 
 Pollabane, 
 Pottle, 
 Rocks, 
 Sally Island, 
 Scotch Island, 
 Shancor, 
 Shantully, 
 Slanore, 
 Snakeel, 
 Thomascourt (Drumroosk), 
 Tircullen, 
 Togher (Danesfort Demesne), 
 Tonymore, 
 Trinity Island, 
 Tully, 
 Urney,

References

External links
 Kilmore Townland Map

Civil parishes of County Cavan
Diocese of Kilmore, Elphin and Ardagh
Roman Catholic Diocese of Kilmore